Piano Solos or Piano Solo may refer to:
 Piano Solos (George Winston album), 1972
 Piano Solos (Cedar Walton album), 1981
 Piano Solo, an envisaged plot for an Italian coup in 1964
 Piano Solo (Thelonious Monk album), 1954
 Piano Solo (Stefano Bollani album), 2005

See also
 Piano solo